Derby Castle Terminus (Manx: Kione Stashoon Chashtal Derby) is the southern terminus of the Manx Electric Railway. It is located on the north side of Douglas, Isle of Man; Douglas Station on the Isle of Man Railway is located on the south side of town, with the MER station being termed "Derby Castle" to differentiate between the two.

Beginnings
The site that now forms the station at Derby Castle is so called because the area to the north at that time housed the vast entertainment complex of the same name.  The enterprising railway company owned the entire site, including the row of houses at Strathallan Crescent and the horse tram sheds and offices above.  Behind this building lay the Calvary Glen which too was the property of the company until 1934.  The houses of the crescent were sold off in 1978 when the entire railway network became government owned, and the railway's offices took up residence in the building above the horse tram sheds at this time also.  This office is now in the ownership of the local authority and renamed the "Strathallan Suite".  This area has been the terminus of the line since it opened in 1893.  At the northerly end of the site was the main entrance to the ballroom complex, and later the car park for the now-demolished Aquadrome Swimming Pool & Sauna which was part of the Summerland complex.

Booking Office
The station still retains the original station booking office dating from 1897, built in a distinctive "rustic" style with half-log cladding, and steep alpine roofing. The facilities are basic and the office measures only 12' 6" by 8' (3.8 m by 2.4 m) and has room for station master and crew only; the station has never had its own toilets for instance, sharing facilities with the nearby Strathallan Hotel (latterly renamed "Terminus Tavern" as it is next to the electric and horse tram termini). Aside from the tarmacadam surfacing and modern shelter, the site remains unchanged since opening.

Track
There is a loop of track to allow the motor car to be shunted around the trailer car.

Strathallan Hotel
The pub next to the station, now called the "Terminus Tavern", was built in 1890 as the Strathallan Lodge, later becoming a hostelry and remained so until 1982 when it was given its current name. It was railway-owned until nationalisation in 1957, having been taken over by the local brewery at that time.  It still forms an integral part of the station, the walls being lined with numerous photographs of the line and other handbills, posters, etc., and it still plays host to off-duty railway workers today.

Canopy
Until 1979 there was a large open roof known as the "Great Canopy". The stanchions for this canopy are now used as flagpoles and/or lampposts, and it can clearly be seen where the canopy was. The canopy, although erected by the railway, provided cover for the tramcars of the Douglas Bay Horse Tramway which also terminates here; the canopy originally featured detailed and intricate metalwork culminating in a central clock tower, distinctive on many early views, but latterly this was removed and a plain roof replaced it.

Other structures
In 1999 a long shelter was added, with a sign to say it was for use in connection with both the electric railway and bus services. Previously a defunct tramcar purchased from Lisbon, Portugal was housed on the siding to the side of the station, and this functioned as a waiting area until it was removed for off-site storage some time later, and now the station offers no cover for waiting passengers other than the incongruous modern shelter. For a short time in the 1980s, a horse car from the horse tramway was used as a shelter.

Features
The station is well known for its many and varied advertising signages, with many any varied styles in evidence denoting "The Highspot Of Your Holiday" in connection with a trip on the Snaefell Mountain Railway and "Shining By The Sea" for Royal Ramsey among the posters.  The station is always covered with informative signage.  A framed manually operated clock face attached to a traction pole shows the time of the next departure.  For the line's centenary in 1993 large planters were added to the site.

Sources

Railway stations in the Isle of Man
Manx Electric Railway
Railway stations opened in 1893